The 2016 Asian Shotgun Championships were held at Al-Forsan International Sports Resort, Abu Dhabi, United Arab Emirates between 1 and 9 November 2016.

Medal summary

Men

Women

Medal table 

 Athletes from Kuwait competed as International Shooting Sport Federation (ISP) due to the suspension of the country's Olympic Committee.

References 

 ISSF Results Overview
 Complete Results

External links 
 Asian Shooting Federation

Asian Shooting Championships
Asian
Shooting